The year 2004 was the 33rd year after the independence of Bangladesh. It was the fourth year of the third term of the government of Khaleda Zia.

Incumbents

 President: Iajuddin Ahmed
 Prime Minister: Khaleda Zia
 Chief Justice: Khondokar Mahmud Hasan (until 27 January), Syed Jillur Rahim Mudasser Husain (starting 27 January)

Demography

Climate

Flood
Following early flooding in the northwest districts of Bangladesh in April, monsoon flood intensified in early July leading to the destruction of the rice crop in that region just before it was harvested. Water persisted in these regions for 3 to 4 weeks whilst gradually draining southwards, severely flooding most of Central Bangladesh. The high water level and widest extent of the flood was reached on 24 July. In total 39 out of 64 districts and 36 million people were affected. The water had receded in most places by mid-August, but in mid-September, a localised depression caused continuous torrential rain and high winds over a six-day period, bringing renewed flooding to many parts of Central Bangladesh, but also flooding areas never normally flooded by the rivers, including Dhaka and other urban areas.

Economy

Note: For the year 2004 average official exchange rate for BDT was 59.51 per US$.

Events

26 March – Rapid Action Battalion (RAB) is formed for crime control.
1 April – Police and Coast Guard interrupted the loading of 10 trucks and seized extensive illegal arms and ammunition at a jetty of Chittagong Urea Fertilizer Limited (CUFL) on the Karnaphuli River. This is believed to be the largest arms smuggling incident in the history of Bangladesh.
9 April – Forty people were killed and 1,000 injured by tornadoes in Netrokona and Mymensingh districts.
20 May – Three people are killed and dozens injured, including the British High Commissioner in Bangladesh, in a bombing at a shrine in Sylhet.
3 August – Bangladesh appeals for aid after flooding that covered 60% of the nation.
21 August – A grenade attack took place at an anti-terrorism rally organised by Awami League on Bangabandhu Avenue in Dhaka. The attack left 24 dead and more than 300 injured. The attack was carried out at 5.22 pm after Sheikh Hasina the leader of opposition finished addressing a crowd of 20,000 people from the back of a truck. The attacks targeted Awami League president Sheikh Hasina, who was injured in the attack.
2 September – Two former police officers convicted of the rape of a girl in 1995 are executed. A third convicted cop was later executed on 29 September.
14 September – Unprecedented heavy rainfall inundated more than two-thirds of Dhaka city.
25 September – The Bangabandhu Sheikh Mujibur Rahman Novo Theatre (earlier named Bhashani Novo Theatre) opened to public.
20 October – Three former army officers were sentenced to death for the assassination of Shaikh Mujibur Rahman and his family in 1975.

Awards and recognitions

International Recognition

 Abdullah Abu Sayeed, the Founder of Bishwo Shahitto Kendro, was awarded Ramon Magsaysay Award.
 ATN Bangla won the special International Children’s Day of Broadcasting Award at the 32nd International Emmy Awards Gala in New York City.

Independence Day Award

Ekushey Padak
 Mohammad Moniruzzaman Miah (education)
 Wakil Ahmed (research)
 Farida Hossain (literature)
 Nilufar Yasmin (music, posthumously)
 Moniruzzaman Monir (music)
 Mustafa Manwar (fine arts)
 Nawab Faizunnesa (social service, posthumously)
 Zobaida Hannan (social service)
 A.Z.M. Enayetullah Khan (journalism)
 Chashi Nazrul Islam (film)

Sports
 Olympics:
 Bangladesh sent a delegation to compete in the 2004 Summer Olympics in Athens, Greece. Bangladesh did not win any medals in the competition.
 Bangladesh also made its Paralympic début at the 2004 Summer Paralympics in Athens. The country was represented by a single athlete competing in one sport, and did not win a medal.
 South Asian (Federation) Games:
 Bangladesh participated in the South Asian Games held in Islamabad, Pakistan. Bangladesh won 3 golds, 13 silvers and 24 bronzes to finish the tournament at the fifth position in overall points table.
 Domestic football:
 Brothers Union (Dhaka) won National Championship title while Muktijoddha SKC (Dhaka) came out runner-up.
 Cricket:
 The Bangladeshi cricket team toured Zimbabwe for a two-match Test series and a five-match One Day International (ODI) series between 19 February and 14 March 2004. Zimbabwe won the Test series 1–0 and the ODI series 2–1.
 Meanwhile, Bangladesh hosted the 2004 Under-19 Cricket World Cup from 15 February to 5 March. Bangladesh could not progress from the group stage, but Enamul Haque from Bangladesh became the highest wicket taker in the tournament.
 Bangladesh toured the West Indies from May to June 2004 to play two Test matches and three Limited Overs Internationals. The first test match was drawn, while West Indies won the second test.
 New Zealand cricket team toured Bangladesh from 14 October to 7 November 2004. They played two Test matches and three One Day Internationals against Bangladesh. New Zealand won all the matches.
 The Indian cricket team toured Bangladesh for two Tests and three ODIs from 10 December 2004 to 27 December 2004. India won the Test series 2-0 and the ODI series 2–1.

Deaths

6 January – Sumita Devi, actor (b. 1936)
10 May – Ershad Sikder, serial killer (executed)
29 May – Anjuman Ara Begum, singer (b. 1942)
26 June 
M. R. Akhtar Mukul, journalist (b. 1929)
Mainur Reza Chowdhury, jurist (b. 1938)
27 June – Humayun Kabir Balu, journalist (b. 1947)
12 August – Humayun Azad, writer (b. 1947)
24 August – Ivy Rahman, politician (b. 1934)
16 December – Nazma Anwar, actor (b. 1941)

See also 
 2000s in Bangladesh
 List of Bangladeshi films of 2004
 Timeline of Bangladeshi history

References